A Place to Call Home may refer to:

A Place to Call Home (1970 film), a 1970 Hong Kong Shaw Brothers drama film 
A Place to Call Home (1987 film), a 1987 Australian TV film 
A Place to Call Home (novel), a 1997 romance novel by Deborah Smith
A Place to Call Home (album), the 1995 debut solo album by Joey Tempest
A Place to Call Home (opera), a 1994 opera by Edward Barnes, commissioned by the Los Angeles Opera
A Place to Call Home (TV series), a 2013–2018 Australian television series